Trophoninae is a subfamily of predatory sea snails, marine gastropod mollusks in the family Muricidae, the rock snails and their allies.

Shell description

Genera 
According to the World Register of Marine Species, genera within the subfamily Trophoninae include:
 Afritrophon Tomlin, 1947
 Anatrophon Iredale, 1929
 Benthoxystus Iredale, 1929
 Conchatalos Houart, 1995
 Coronium Simone, 1996
 Enatimene Iredale, 1929
 Fuegotrophon Powell, 1951
 Gemixystus Iredale, 1929
 Leptotrophon Houart, 1995
 Litozamia Iredale, 1929
 Minortrophon Finlay, 1926
 Nipponotrophon Kuroda & Habe, 1971
 Nodulotrophon Habe & Ito, 1965
 Scabrotrophon McLean, 1996
 Tromina Dall, 1918
 Trophon Montfort, 1810
 Warenia Houart, Vermeij & Wiedrick, 2019
 Xenotrophon Iredale, 1929

References

 
Muricidae